Basheer Mauladad (1931–2014) was a prominent Kenyan Asian.  His father, Chaudry, was a successful civil engineer in East Africa and Basheer took over the family business while his older brother, Iqbal, became the famous white hunter, "Bali".  Basheer was influential in breaking down the colour bar in Kenya and negotiating independence.  He was also a prominent philanthropist and historian for the Kenyan Asian community.

References

Further reading

1931 births
Kenyan people of Indian descent
2014 deaths
Kenyan engineers
Kenyan Muslims
Kenyan people of Asian descent